The World Fellowship of Buddhists (WFB) is an international Buddhist organization. Initiated by Gunapala Piyasena Malalasekera, it was founded in 1950 in Colombo, Ceylon (present-day Sri Lanka), by representatives from 27 nations. Although Theravada Buddhists are most influential in the organization, (its headquarters are in Thailand and all of its presidents have been from Sri Lanka or southeast Asia), members of all Buddhist schools are active in the WFB. It now has regional centers in 35 countries, including India, the United States, Australia, and several nations of Africa and Europe, in addition to traditional Buddhist countries.

The aims and objectives of the World Fellowship of Buddhists are:
To promote among the members strict observance and practice of the teachings of the Buddha
To secure unity, solidarity, and brotherhood amongst Buddhists
To propagate the sublime doctrine of the Buddha
To organize and carry on activities in the field of social, educational, cultural and other humanitarian services
To work for happiness, harmony and peace on earth and to collaborate with other organizations working for the same ends.

The current president is Phan Wannamethee of Thailand serving since 1999, while Venerable Hsing Yun of the Republic of China (Taiwan) served as honorary president.

Affiliates

Australia
Buddhist Council of New South Wales
Buddhist Discussion Centre (Upwey)
The Buddhist Federation of Australia
The Buddhist Foundation
United Vietnamese Buddhist Congregation in Australia & New Zealand

Austria
Osterrichische Buddhistische Union (Austrian Buddhist Union)

Bangladesh
 Agrasara Memorial Society of Bangladesh
 Anoma Cultural Association
 Bangladesh Bouddha Kristi Prachar Sangha
 Bangladesh Buddhist Association
 Bangladesh Buddhist Federation 
 Bangladesh Rakhaing-Marma Sangha Council
 Parbatya Bouddha Sangha, Sakyamuni Bouddha Sangha
  The Supreme Sangha Council of Bangladesh

Belgium
Buddhist Study Centre of Belgium

Bhutan
Dratshang Lhentshog (National Council of Sangha Communities)

Brazil
Federacao das Seitas Buddhists do Brasil
Sociedade Budista do Brasil

Burma (see Myanmar)

Cambodia
Buddhism Community for Development of Cambodia
Buddhist Association Khmer Republic

Canada
Buddhist Church of Canada
International Buddhist Friends Association (IBFA)
True Faith Buddhism Association of Canada Inc.
Universal Buddhist Temple
Vietnamese Buddhist Association of Canada

China
Buddhist Association of China

Czechoslovakia
Dr. Dusan J. Kafka

Finland
Buddhismin Ystavat

France
Association Cultuelle Bouddhique De Marseille (Vallondes Tuves)
Association Zen International (AZI)
French Regional Centre of WFB
French-Vietnamese Buddhist Association
World Linh-Son Buddhist Congregation

Germany
Deutsche Buddhistische Union (DBU)
European Buddhist Union
Order Arya Maitreya Mandala (AMM)

Ghana
The Maha Bodhi Society of Ghana

Great Britain
Amaravati Buddhist Centre
The Buddhist Society

Hong Kong
Hong Kong Buddhist Sangha Association
The Hong Kong Buddhist Association
WFB Hong Kong and Macau Regional Centre

India
All Asam Buddhist Association
All India Buddhist Mission
Ambedkar Buddhist Academy
Asoka Mission
Bhikkhu Sangha's United Buddhist Mission
Bouddhjan Panchayat Samiti, "Panchayatan" Dr. Ambedkar
Buddhist International Centre
Buddhist Society of India
Buddhist Society Service Centre
Department of Ecclesiastical Affairs - Sikkim
Department of Religion and Culture
Dharma Chakra Centre
Dr. Babasaheb Ambedkar Samarak Samiti
Indian Buddhist Society
International Brotherhood Mission
International Buddha Education Institute
International Meditation Centre
Kalimpong Dharmodaya Sabha
Ladakh Buddhist Association
Maha Bodhi Asoka Mission
Maha Bodhi Society of India
Pali Bhasha Adhyayan Parishad
Pradnya Karuna Vihar Samiti, Nanded
Shri Dadasaheb Gawai Charitable Trust, Amravati, "Kamal Pushpa"
The Bengal Buddhist Association
The Karmapa International Buddhist Institute
The Sangha Mitra
The South India Buddhist Association
Triloka Buddha Mahasangha Sahayak Gana
Vishwa Buddha Parishad
Yashodhara Mahila Vikas Manda

Indonesia
Buddha Dharma Indonesia Institution Foundation
Gabungan Tridharma Indonesia (GTI)
Jakarta Dhammacakka Jaya Foundation
Perwakilan Umat Buddha Indonesia 1978 (Walubi 1978)

Japan
Japan Buddhist Federation

South Korea
The Korea Fellowship of Buddhists
WFB Korea Regional Centre
Won Buddhism

North Korea
Korea Buddhist Federation

Laos
WFB Regional Centre

Malaysia
Buddhist Missionary Society Malaysia
WFB Penang Regional Centre
WFB Selangor Regional Centre

Mongolia
Tashi Choi Ling Monastery
The Centre of Mongolian Buddhists

Myanmar
Sayadaw U Thittila
The Buddhist Discussion Group
The Chittagong Buddhist Association

Nepal
Dharmodaya Sabha

Netherlands
International Zen Institute Netherlands

Philippines
WFB Philippines Regional Centre

Singapore
The Buddhist Union
The Singapore Regional Centre of WFB

Sri Lanka
All-Ceylon Buddhist Congress
German Dharmaduta Society
Sri Lanka Regional Centre of WFB

Sweden
Buddhismens Venners
Svenska Buddhistiska Samfudes

Taiwan
Chinese Buddhist Temple Association
Fo Guang Shan Monastery
Han Tzang Cultural Association
The Buddhist Association
The Lay Buddhist Association

Tanzania
The Buddhist Association

Thailand
Buddhadhamma Foundation
Dhammapradipa Association
Luang-Poh Viriyoung Sirintharo Foundation (LVS)
The Buddhist Association of Chon Buri Province
The Buddhist Association of Nakhon Pathom Province
The Buddhist Association of Thailand
The Thai-Chinese Buddhist Association of Thailand
The Young Buddhist Association of Thailand

United States
Association of Vietnamese Buddhist Nuns in America
Buddha's Universal Church
Buddhist Churches of America
Buddhist Sangha Council of Southern California
Congregation of Vietnamese Buddhist in the USA
Friends of Buddhism
International Buddhist Meditation Centre
International Zen Institute of America
Khmer Buddhist Society of New England
Los Angeles Buddhist Church Federation
Mook Rim Buddhist Society International
Pureland Lotus Community
Sambosa Buddhist Temple of California
San Francisco Zen Center
Shasta Abbey
Sonoma Mountain Zen Center
The Buddhist Temple of Chicago
Tibetan Nyingma Meditation Centre
Union of Vietnamese Buddhist Churches in the United States of America
Universal Buddhist Fellowship
Vajradhatu Buddhist Meditation Centre (former)
Vietnamese Buddhist Renovation Committee
Vietnamese Theravada Buddhist Sangha Congregation
WFB Hawaii Regional Centre
Young Buddhist Association

USSR
Central Spiritual Board of Buddhists of the USSR (former)

Vietnam
Theravadin Buddhist Association

See also
 Buddhist councils
 Index of Buddhism-related articles
 International Buddhist Confederation
 Maha Bodhi Society
 Pre-sectarian Buddhism
 World Buddhist Sangha Council

References

External links
World Fellowship of Buddhists homepage

International Buddhist organizations
Religious organizations established in 1950
1950 establishments in Ceylon
International organizations based in Thailand